"Share Your Love with Me" is a song written by Alfred Braggs and Deadric Malone.  It was originally recorded by blues singer Bobby "Blue" Bland. Over the years, the song has been covered by various artists, most notably Aretha Franklin who won a Grammy Award for her 1969 rendition. Other artists who covered the song include The Band in 1973, Kenny Rogers in 1981, and most recently, Van Morrison in 2016.

Bobby "Blue" Bland version
Bobby "Blue" Bland recorded the song for his 1963 album, Call on Me. His version peaked at #42 on the Billboard Hot 100 and #5 on the Hot Rhythm & Blues Singles chart. It also reached #15 in Canada.

Chart performance

Aretha Franklin version

Aretha Franklin recorded the song for her 1970 album, This Girl's in Love with You.  Her single spent five weeks at number-one on the Best Selling Soul Singles chart and peaked at #13 on the Billboard Hot 100 on September 13, 1969. The song earned Franklin a Grammy Award for Best R&B Vocal Performance, Female in 1970. In March 1971 Aretha recorded two live versions of the song during her three-day concert at the Fillmore West in San Francisco; one of the two version is on the 2006 deluxe edition of Aretha Live at Fillmore West, and both versions are on the 2005 remastered Don't Fight The Feeling: The Complete Aretha Franklin & King Curtis Live at Fillmore West.

Chart performance

Kenny Rogers version

Kenny Rogers recorded this song for his 1981 album, Share Your Love. It was released in September 1981 as the second single from the album. His version, featuring Gladys Knight & The Pips, peaked at #14 on the Billboard Hot 100 and #5 on the Hot Country Singles chart.  Rogers' version also reached number one on the Adult Contemporary Singles chart.

Chart performance

Other versions
Other versions have been recorded by Johnny Adams, the Band, Shirley Brown, Hope Clarke, Freddy Fender, The Fantastic Four, Lonnie Mack, Van Morrison, Charlie Rich,   Phoebe Snow, and Susan Tedeschi.

See also
List of number-one R&B singles of 1969 (U.S.)
List of number-one adult contemporary singles of 1981 (U.S.)

References

External links
[ Aretha Franklin's version song review] on Allmusic

1964 songs
1964 singles
1969 singles
1981 singles
Songs written by Don Robey
Aretha Franklin songs
Kenny Rogers songs
Song recordings produced by Arif Mardin
Song recordings produced by Jerry Wexler
Song recordings produced by Tom Dowd
Duke Records singles
Atlantic Records singles
Liberty Records singles
Songs written by Ronnie Shannon